Di Dongdong (born 29 December 1993) is a Chinese para-athlete, who won gold in the long jump T11 event at the 2020 Summer Paralympics.

References

1993 births
Living people
Sportspeople from Liaoyang
Athletes from Liaoning
Chinese male long jumpers
Chinese male sprinters
Paralympic athletes of China
Paralympic gold medalists for China
Paralympic silver medalists for China
Paralympic bronze medalists for China
Athletes (track and field) at the 2016 Summer Paralympics
Athletes (track and field) at the 2020 Summer Paralympics
Medalists at the 2016 Summer Paralympics
Medalists at the 2020 Summer Paralympics
Paralympic medalists in athletics (track and field)
Medalists at the World Para Athletics Championships
World Para Athletics Championships winners
21st-century Chinese people
Medalists at the 2018 Asian Para Games